Melbourne City Football Club is an Australian professional association football club based in Melbourne, Australia. The club was formed 2009 as Melbourne Heart before it was renamed to Melbourne City in 2014. They were the second Victorian club admitted into the A-League Men in 2010.

There have been five permanent and two caretaker managers of Melbourne City since 2010; John van 't Schip has managed the club in two separate spells.

This chronological list comprises all those who have held the position of manager of the first team of Melbourne City since their foundation in 2009. Each manager's entry includes his dates of tenure and the club's overall competitive record (in terms of matches won, drawn and lost), honours won and significant achievements while under his care. Caretaker managers are included, where known, as well as those who have been in permanent charge.

Managers
 Manager dates and nationalities are sourced from worldfootball.net for van 't Schnip to Aloisi and Soccerbase thereafter for van 't Schnip to Kisnorbo. Statistics are sourced from ALeagueStats.com. Names of caretaker managers are supplied where known, and periods of caretaker management are highlighted in italics and marked caretaker or caretaker, then permanent appointment, depending on the scenario. Win percentage is rounded to two decimal places.
 Only first-team competitive matches are counted. Wins, losses and draws are results at the final whistle; the results of penalty shoot-outs are not counted.
Statistics are complete as of 19 March 2023.

Key
 M = matches played; W = matches won; D = matches drawn; L = matches lost; GF = Goals for; GA = Goals against; Win % = percentage of total matches won
   Managers with this background and symbol in the "Name" column are italicised to denote caretaker appointments.
   Managers with this background and symbol in the "Name" column are italicised to denote caretaker appointments promoted to full-time manager.

Notes

References

External links
 
 
 

Melbourne City FC managers
Melbourne City
Melbourne sport-related lists